Schlafen family member 11 is a protein that in humans is encoded by the SLFN11 gene.

References

Further reading